Khimik Stadion is a multi-use stadium in Kemerovo, Russia.  It is currently used mostly for football and bandy matches. The stadium had a capacity of 32,000 people, since 2018 it has been 17,000. It is the home ground for bandy club Kuzbass.

References

External links
Official homepage

Football venues in Russia
Bandy venues in Russia
Sport in Kemerovo
Buildings and structures in Kemerovo Oblast
Bandy World Championships stadiums